Matt MacLennan is a television writer/producer in both comedy/drama. Matt has also written for film and video games like Tom Clancy's Splinter Cell: Blacklist by Ubisoft.

Filmography

Television

Film

External links 
 
 TV Writer Podcast
 TV EH? Podcast
 The Star "TV shows like Orphan Black signal rise of the Canadian showrunner"

Canadian television writers
Canadian television producers
Year of birth missing (living people)
Living people